Prime Evil may refer to:

Prime Evil (album), by Venom, 1989
Prime Evil (EP), by Raymond Watts, 1997
Prime Evil (anthology), a 1988 anthology of horror short stories
Prime Evil (Buffy novel), a 2000 Buffy the Vampire Slayer novel
Prime Evil, the primary villain in the animated series Ghostbusters
 Eugene de Kock (born 1949), nicknamed Prime Evil, South African former police colonel and assassin

See also
Primevil (disambiguation)
Primeval (disambiguation)